Janhunen is a Finnish surname. Notable people with the surname include:

 Juha Janhunen (born 1952), Finnish linguist
 Pekka Janhunen, Finnish space physicist, astrobiologist, and inventor
, Finnish politician, minister in Pekkala Cabinet and Paasikivi III Cabinet

See also
Janhonen

Finnish-language surnames